Levar Harper-Griffith (born September 4, 1981) is a former professional tennis player from the United States.

Career

Juniors
Harper-Griffith was a boys' singles quarter-finalist at the 1999 Australian Open and a boys' doubles semi-finalist (with Andy Roddick) at the 1999 US Open.

Pro tour
On top of their semifinal run in the juniors, Harper-Griffith also competed with Roddick in the men's doubles draw at the 1999 US Open, making the second round. At the 2001 US Open, Harper-Griffith lost to Spaniard Albert Costa in the opening round of the men's singles. It would be his only appearance in the men's singles draw of a Grand Slam but he did make another US Open doubles appearance, in 2002, with Eric Taino. The pair defeated Dominik Hrbatý and Andre Sa in the first round, before being eliminated in the second round by Jiri Novak and Radek Štěpánek.

Challenger titles

Singles: (1)

Doubles: (1)

References

1981 births
Living people
American male tennis players
African-American male tennis players
Tennis people from New York (state)
21st-century African-American sportspeople
20th-century African-American people